Boyd Mwila (born 28 July 1984) is a Zambian football striker who last played for FC Trollhättan. He has played for Chiparamba Great Eagles in Zambia and Örgryte, Djurgården and FC Trollhättan in Sweden. In March 2010 he was loaned out to Superettan club FC Trollhättan The loan was extended through the 2011 season in December 2010. The contract with Djurgården was ultimately terminated in November 2011.

After the termination of the contract Mwila sensationally signed with the division 4 team Vänersborgs FK in July 2012.

References

External links
 

1984 births
Living people
Zambian footballers
Zambia international footballers
Zambian expatriate footballers
Örgryte IS players
Djurgårdens IF Fotboll players
FC Trollhättan players
Allsvenskan players
Superettan players
Expatriate footballers in Sweden
Zambian expatriate sportspeople in Sweden

Association football forwards